The Age of Innocence (also called Minors) is a 1976 Soviet film directed by Vladimir Rogovoy and written by Edward Topol. It is not based on the novel The Age of Innocence, instead being a juvenile delinquency film set in the contemporary Soviet Union.

Plot
Russian teenager Zhenya Prokhorov returns home from military service and his friend Kostya from a corrective labor colony. They try to stay out of trouble and find a place in the world.

Cast
Vladimir Letenkov  - Zhenya Prokhorov
Stanislav Zhdanko - Kostya Sila
Leonid Kayurov - "Gogol"
Pavel Nikolai - Shurik
Nikolay Muravyov - police major
Vera Vasilyeva - Polina Borisovna, teacher, Zhenya's mother
Yuri Medvedev - policeman Kuvaev
Igor Oshotin - Alka
Nadezhda Rumyantseva - Alka's mother
Yuri Kuzmenkov - Alka's father, an alcoholic

Reception

The Soviet journal Cinema Art gave The Age of Innocence a negative review.

It was the highest-grossing film in the Soviet Union for 1977, with 44.6 million tickets sold.

References

External links

 (in Russian, no subtitles)

1976 drama films
Soviet crime drama films
Gorky Film Studio films
Films directed by Vladimir Rogovoy
Soviet teen films